Robin Liddell (born 28 February 1974) is a Scottish racing driver who currently competes in the Michelin Pilot Challenge.

Career

Liddell has two series championships to his name, winning the GT class of the 2001 European Le Mans Series and the GS class of the 2015 Continental Tire Sports Car Challenge.

In 2014, Liddell joined Corvette Racing for the inaugural season of the United SportsCar Championship, lining up for the team at Daytona and Sebring. In 2018, Liddell took on a dual driver and team manager role with Michelin Pilot Challenge team Rebel Rock Racing, having driven for the team in previous years. The following season, in a race at Road America, Liddell edged out the McLaren of Kuno Wittmer to the line by seven hundredths of a second after Wittmer had inadvertently hit his pit limiter on the way to the finish.

Racing record

Complete American Le Mans Series results
(key) (Races in bold indicate pole position)

Complete Grand-Am Rolex Sports Car Series results
(key) (Races in bold indicate pole position)

Complete WeatherTech SportsCar Championship results
(key) (Races in bold indicate pole position)

Complete 24 Hours of Le Mans results

References

External links
Robin Liddell at Motorsport.com

1974 births
Living people
Scottish racing drivers
24 Hours of Daytona drivers
WeatherTech SportsCar Championship drivers
Corvette Racing drivers
Greaves Motorsport drivers
24 Hours of Le Mans drivers
Michelin Pilot Challenge drivers